Lūcija Garūta (14 May 1902 – 15 February 1977) was a Latvian pianist, poet and composer. She is mostly known for composing the cantata Dievs, Tava zeme deg! in 1943.

Life and career
Lūcija Garūta was born in Riga (at the time Russian Empire) in the family of an accountant. During her studies she was the pianist répétiteur at the Latvian National Opera.

After graduation, she worked at Riga Radio from 1925 to 1926. In 1926 she also continued her studies with Alfred Cortot, Isidor Philipp and Paul Le Flem, and in 1928 she studied composition with Paul Dukas at the Paris École Normale de Musique. In 1926 she made her debut in Paris, and afterwards became active as a composer, holding concerts with singers ,  and Mariss Vētra, violinist Rūdolfs Miķelsons and cellist Atis Teihmanis. In 1939 she served on the Latvian music promotion association's board of directors. In the 1920s and 1930s, Lūcija Garūta was one of the most active pianists both as a soloist as well as accompanist, performing in Riga and in all of Latvia. Overall, Garūta performed with more than 100 musicians in chamber music concerts.

In 1940, shortly before the Soviet occupation of Latvia took place, Garūta took a position teaching composition and music theory at the Latvian Conservatory, where she was elected to professor in 1960. Illness ended her performing career in the late 1940s, but she continued to teach.

Lūcija Garūta died in 1977 in Riga (at the time Latvian SSR, Soviet Union) and was buried at the 1st Riga Forest Cemetery. Since 2002, the bi-annual International Young Pianists Competition of Lūcija Garūta has been held in Latvia in her memory.

God, your land is burning!
Garūta's 1943 cantata Dievs, Tava zeme deg! (God, your land is burning!) is a part of the musical category of the Latvian Cultural Canon, recognized as one of the most important Latvian musical pieces of all time.

The musical piece was written during the German occupation of Latvia during World War II. A tape of its premiere on 15 March 1944 with Garūta playing the organ, although recorded at the St. Gertrude Old Church in Riga, is said to have captured the sounds of battle that were heard outside of the Riga Dome Cathedral. The premiere featured massed choirs conducted by  while the composer played the Riga Cathedral pipe organ.

The cantata was banned under the Soviet occupation of Latvia and the recordings were considered destroyed. Despite this, in 1980, Latvian exile composer Longins Apkalns restored the original recording of 1944 by using fragments from the German Radio Archives and thus Dievs, Tava zeme deg! was once again played on May 8, 1982 in Stockholm for the first time since WWII, after which the work became well known among the Latvian exile diaspora.

During the Singing Revolution the piece was rehabilitated and in 1990, after a 46-year-long silence, it was once again performed publicly in Latvia at the final concert of the 20th Latvian Song Festival with over ten thousand singers. Since then, Garūta's work has been performed both domestically and abroad in Japan, Germany and other countries.

Works
Selected works include:
Dievs, tava zeme deg! (1943) for soloists, chorus and organ
Piano Concerto in F sharp minor (1952)
Prelude for piano in C sharp minor
Prelude for piano in E Major
Andante Tranquillo', piano trio in B

Her works have been recorded and issued on media, including:Latvian Patriotic Cantatas, Audio CD (May 18, 1999), Riga Recording, ASIN: B00000J8QKDievs, Tava zeme deg!'' (January 1, 2003) Baltic Records Group, ASIN: B000QZX3VM

References

External links
 
 Recording of Dievs, Tava zeme deg! premiere and short commentary

1902 births
1977 deaths
People from Riga
People from Kreis Riga
20th-century classical composers
20th-century women composers
20th-century classical pianists
20th-century organists
Latvian composers
Latvian classical pianists
Latvian organists
Women classical composers
Music educators
Women classical pianists
Women organists
Women music educators
École Normale de Musique de Paris alumni
Academic staff of Jāzeps Vītols Latvian Academy of Music
Burials at Forest Cemetery, Riga
Soviet pianists
Soviet composers
Soviet organists
20th-century women pianists